Estonians in Abkhazia are a minority residing in Abkhazia, recognized worldwide as an autonomous region of Georgia but de facto an independent country. Estonians began to emigrate to Abkhazia when the region became part of the Russian Empire and many Abkhazians left or were expelled. The tsarist regime began to repopulate the area with its Christian subjects, including Estonians. There were numerous waves of migration from Estonia to Abkhazia, where the peasants were promised land. Among others, they founded the villages Salme and Estonka. In the villages, the Estonians also had their own schools.

During and after the Georgian-Abkhazian war, many Estonians fled to Estonia; in one single operation in 1992, the Estonian authorities evacuated 170 Estonians.

Estonians currently (2003 data) number 0.2% of the population of Abkhazia. The biggest share of Estonians living in the capital Sukhumi was back in 1939 - 206 Estonians resided there that made up 0.5% of the population. Most Abkhazian Estonians live in Western Abkhazia.

See also
 Tangerines

References

Estonian diaspora
Ethnic groups in Abkhazia